Sandrine Bideau (born 12 April 1989) is a French road cyclist, who currently rides for UCI Women's Continental Team . She participated at the 2012 UCI Road World Championships.

In 2015, Bideau finished second at the Grand Prix de Plumelec-Morbihan Dames and seventh at La Classique Morbihan.

Bideau was injured in June 2016 when she was struck by a following emergency car during the Vesoul One Day Race.

References

External links

1989 births
French female cyclists
Living people
Sportspeople from Seine-Saint-Denis
People from Le Blanc-Mesnil
Cyclists from Île-de-France
21st-century French women